ID Quantique (IDQ) is a Swiss company, based in Geneva, Switzerland, and provides quantum key distribution (QKD) systems, quantum safe network encryption, single photon counters, and hardware random number generators.

It was founded in 2001 as a spin-off of the Group of Applied Physics at the University of Geneva.

The company is structured in three business units: 
 The quantum safe cryptography division
 The photon counting division
 The quantum random number generation division

Quantum Safe Cryptography Division 

The Quantum Safe Cryptography division focuses on data protection and provides:
 quantum-safe network encryption
 quantum key distribution
 quantum key generation and key management

Photon Counting Division 

The Photon Counting division works on optical instrumentation products such as:
 photon counters in the visible and infrared spectrum
 photon pair sources 
 quantum key distribution for R&D applications

Random Number Generation 

The company's work in Random Number Generation focuses on developing hardware random number generators based on quantum randomness, for cryptographic and security applications (quantum key generation) and research purposes (MonteCarlo simulations).

ID Quantique Achievements 

The company has realized several world premieres in quantum technology innovation. 
 In 2004, ID Quantique was one of the first in the world to bring a quantum key distribution system to a commercial market. (MagiQ Technologies, Inc. announced the availability of its quantum key distribution system in 2003.)
 In 2007 quantum cryptography was deployed by a government for the first time ever to protect the Geneva state elections in Switzerland. It is still in deployment.
 In 2010 the company deployed QKD over multiplexed networks with 1Gbit/s of data, and in 2011 the company ran its QKD systems for over 18 months in the Swissquantum network in cooperation with the University of Geneva.
 In 2014, principles from IDQ together with the University of Geneva, broke the world record for the longest distance key exchange by QKD – 307 km.
 In 2014 IDQ's Quantis true random number generator became the first QRNG to pass the German BSI's AIS31 randomness validation.
 In 2014 ID Quantique and Battelle co-founded the Quantum-Safe Security Working Group in the Cloud Security Alliance (CSA). The group aims to help governments and industry understand quantum‐safe methods for protecting their networks and their data, following the call by the European telecommunications Institute (ETSI) for quantum safe cryptography in their 2014 white paper “Quantum Safe Cryptography and Security”.
 ID Quantique also announced their Quantum Random Number Generator (QRNG) chip has been integrated in the ‘Vsmart Aris 5G’ smartphone made by VinSmart, a member of Vingroup from Vietnam.

See also 
 Quantum key distribution
 Quantum cryptography
 Hardware random number generator

Notes 

Cryptography companies
Software companies of Switzerland
Companies based in Geneva
Quantum cryptography